Brian Paul Kingman (born July 27, 1953) is a former Major League Baseball pitcher from 1979 to 1983 for the Oakland Athletics and San Francisco Giants.

He attended the University of California, Santa Barbara before signing with the Athletics in 1975. In 1979, he went 7–2 in the Pacific Coast League and made his major league debut in June.

Kingman is most famous for losing 20 games in 1980. He remained the most current pitcher to do so for 23 years, until Mike Maroth lost 21 games for the Detroit Tigers in 2003. Kingman also pitched a career-high  innings in 1980. Kingman was mostly a starting pitcher (94 appearances, 82 starts) but on July 21, 1982, he did pick up his one and only MLB save. Kingman pitched the final 2 1/3 innings to nail down a 6-4 Oakland victory over the Indians.  He retired in 1984.

In 94 major league games, Kingman compiled a 23–45 record.

References

External links
, or Retrosheet, or Pura Pelota (Venezuelan Winter League)

1953 births
Living people
Baseball players from Los Angeles
Boise A's players
Chattanooga Lookouts players
Major League Baseball pitchers
Modesto A's players
Oakland Athletics players
Ogden A's players
Phoenix Giants players
San Francisco Giants players
San Jose Missions players
Santa Monica College alumni
Santa Monica Corsairs baseball players
Tacoma Tigers players
Tiburones de La Guaira players
American expatriate baseball players in Venezuela
UC Santa Barbara Gauchos baseball players
University High School (Los Angeles) alumni